is a French-born Japanese handball player for C' Chartres Métropole handball and the Japanese national team.

He participated at the 2017 World Men's Handball Championship.

References

1989 births
Living people
Handball players from Paris
Japanese male handball players
French male handball players
Japanese people of French descent
French people of Japanese descent
Handball players at the 2020 Summer Olympics